Garnavillo is a city in Clayton County, Iowa, United States. The population was 763 at the time of the 2020 census, up from 754 in 2000.

History
Garnavillo once served as county seat of Clayton County.

Geography
Garnavillo is located at  (42.866978, -91.236087).

Demographics

2010 census
As of the census of 2010, there were 745 people, 332 households, and 201 families living in the city. The racial makeup of the city was 98.3% White, 0.5% African American, 0.8% from other races, and 0.4% from two or more races. Hispanic or Latino of any race were 1.6% of the population.

There were 332 households, of which 22.3% had children under the age of 18 living with them, 47.9% were married couples living together, 8.1% had a female householder with no husband present, 4.5% had a male householder with no wife present, and 39.5% were non-families. 35.5% of all households were made up of individuals, and 22.3% had someone living alone who was 65 years of age or older. The average household size was 2.16 and the average family size was 2.73.

The median age in the city was 48.5 years. 17.7% of residents were under the age of 18; 5.7% were between the ages of 18 and 24; 21.5% were from 25 to 44; 27.2% were from 45 to 64; and 27.9% were 65 years of age or older. The gender makeup of the city was 49.5% male and 50.5% female.

2000 census
As of the census of 2000, there were 754 people, 327 households, and 205 families living in the city. The racial makeup of the city was 99.87% White and 0.13% African American.

There were 327 households, out of which 23.9% had children under the age of 18 living with them, 50.2% were married couples living together, 7.6% had a female householder with no husband present, and 37.3% were non-families. 32.1% of all households were made up of individuals, and 21.7% had someone living alone who was 65 years of age or older. The average household size was 2.19 and the average family size was 2.72.

In the city, the population was spread out, with 19.9% under the age of 18, 5.6% from 18 to 24, 21.5% from 25 to 44, 24.8% from 45 to 64, and 28.2% who were 65 years of age or older. The median age was 47 years. For every 100 females, there were 99.5 males. For every 100 females age 18 and over, there were 92.4 males.

The median income for a household in the city was $35,694, and the median income for a family was $44,107. Males had a median income of $27,000 versus $20,227 for females. The per capita income for the city was $20,964. About 2.4% of families and 9.3% of the population were below the poverty line, including 3.8% of those under age 18 and 7.6% of those age 65 or over.

Economy

The town is home to Thoma's Dairy Bar, a diner and restaurant, serving American food and homemade pies and malts. Garnavillo Auction Company is located on Main Street and draws hundreds of people to the community for their auctions two times a month.

Education
Public schools are operated by the Clayton Ridge Community School District, which formed in 2005 in the merger of the Guttenberg Community School District and the Garnavillo Community School District.

Notable people
 Marion Murdoch

References

External links

Garnavillo Portal style community links website
City-Data Comprehensive statistical data and more about Garnavillo

Cities in Iowa
Cities in Clayton County, Iowa